Sedalia is a populated place in Collin County, Texas, United States. It is near the border of Grayson County and two miles from Westminster.

Population
In 1896 Sedalia had an estimated population of 100, but since 1940 the population has been estimated at 20–25. In 1990 it was 25. The population remained unchanged in 2000.

History
Sedalia was previously known as Yakima. It had a post office from January 15, 1889, and by 1896 had two churches and several other facilities. The mail service ceased in 1903 and ran thereafter through Van Alstyne in Grayson County.

References

External links
 TopoQuest
 TX HomeTownLocator
 Roadside Thoughts

Unincorporated communities in Collin County, Texas
Unincorporated communities in Texas